The Story's Been Told is an album by Jamaican reggae group Third World, released by Island Records in 1979.

The album is representative of the band's transition from roots reggae to the more pop-oriented work of its later years. The song "Talk to Me" charted in the UK at #54.

Critical reception
Timothy White, in The New York Times, praised the album, writing: "'Talk to Me,' the rollicking centerpiece of The Story's Been Told, will probably find a favorable audience among the dance crowd; the sound is marvellously lean and smoothly paced, with strong vocal attacks by William (Bunny Rugs) Clarke, the lead singer."

Reggae & Caribbean Music highlighted the album's "tight disco riffs."

Track listing

Personnel
Bunny Rugs: Vocals
Michael "Ibo" Cooper: Keyboards
Steven "Cat" Coore: Lead guitar
Irvin "Carrot" Jarrett: Percussions
Richard "Richie" Daley: Bass
Willie Stewart: Drums
Produced by Third World.

References

Third World (band) albums
1979 albums
Island Records albums